George Wright is a Jamaican politician.

Political career 
He resigned from the Jamaica Labour Party in June 2021.

References 

Living people
21st-century Jamaican politicians
Independent politicians in Jamaica
Jamaica Labour Party politicians
Members of the House of Representatives of Jamaica
People from Westmoreland Parish
Year of birth missing (living people)
Members of the 14th Parliament of Jamaica